Eucalyptus eremophila, commonly known as the sand mallet or tall sand mallee, is a species of mallet that is endemic to semi-arid regions of Western Australia. It has smooth pale brown and greyish bark, narrow lance-shaped to elliptical adult leaves, flower buds arranged in groups of between seven and eleven with an elongated operculum, and cup-shaped to barrel-shaped fruit.

Description
It has smooth, polished pale brown to greyish bark that is shed in late summer. Flowering occurs from August to December and the flowers are lemon yellow, sometimes pale pink.

Taxonomy and naming
The sand mallet was first formally described in 1904 by Ludwig Diels from material collected near Boorabbin in the Coolgardie district by Ernst Georg Pritzel. Diels gave it the name Eucalyptus occidentalis var. eremophila and published the description in the journal Botanische Jahrbücher für Systematik, Pflanzengeschichte und Pflanzengeographie. In the same journal, Adolf Engler published the first formal description of E. occidentalis. In 1920, Joseph Maiden raised the variety to species status as E. eremophila.

Two subspecies of E. eremophila are accepted by the Australian Plant Census:
 Eucalyptus eremophila (Diels) Maiden subsp. eremophila;
 Eucalyptus eremophila subsp. pterocarpa (Blakely & H.Steedman) L.A.S.Johnson & Blaxell.

The specific epithet (eremophila) is derived from the Greek eremi- meaning "desert" and philos 'lover'.

The eucalypt is associated with the western mallee subgroup which is characterised by several eucalypts, including E. oleosa, E. moderata, E. incrassata, E. foecunda, E. redunca and E. uncinata. The understorey is predominantly shrubby with species of Melaleuca and Acacia along with the occasional Triodia.

Distribution and habitat
Eucalyptus eremophila is found on undulating plains, hills and sand dunes in the Wheatbelt and Goldfields-Esperance region of Western Australia where it grows in skeletal sandy soils over granite. It is found as far north west as Quairading in the central Wheatbelt to the western edge of the Nullarbor Plain in the south east.

Conservation status
Sand mallet is classified as "not threatened" by the Western Australian Government Department of Parks and Wildlife.

Use in horticulture
This plant is sold commercially in the form of seed or tube stock as an ornamental plant but is also used as an erosion control, windbreak or shade plant for wide verges, nature strips or parks and reserves. It prefers a full sun position and is regarded as quite hardy being drought tolerant and able to withstand a moderate frost. It grows in neutral to acid soils and can be grown in coastal areas. It is also a good habitat for birds and attracts them with its nectar. The seeds germinate readily.

See also
List of Eucalyptus species

References

Further reading
 Holliday, I. A field guide to Australian trees (3rd edition), Reed New Holland, 2002
 Cronin, L. Key Guide to Australian Trees, Envirobook, 2000

eremophila
Eucalypts of Western Australia
Myrtales of Australia
Mallees (habit)
Taxa named by Ludwig Diels
Plants described in 1921